This List of World Champions in Driving includes  Singles-, Pairs- and Four-in-Hand. Pony World Championships are mentioned as well.

Singles World Championships 
The Singles World Championships take place every second year. There is an individual and a team competition.

* 2000 the Singles World Championships was cancelled because of a viral disease.

Pairs World Championships

Four-in-Hand World Championships

Pony World Championships

References

Horse driving
Lists of sports world champions
World championships in equestrianism

de:Liste der Weltmeister im Fahrsport